John Anthony Boissonneau (born December 7, 1949 in Scarborough) is a Roman Catholic Auxiliary Bishop in Toronto, Canada.

He was ordained a priest on December 14, 1974.

Pope John Paul II appointed him Titular Bishop of Tambeae and Auxiliary Bishop of Toronto on March 23, 2001. The Archbishop of Toronto, Cardinal Aloysius Ambrozic, gave him the episcopal ordination on May 29 of the same year; co-consecrators were the auxiliary bishops in Toronto Nicola De Angelis CFIC, and Anthony Giroux Meagher.

References

21st-century Roman Catholic titular bishops
21st-century Roman Catholic bishops in Canada
1949 births
Living people